Ribera (Sicilian: Rivela) is a comune in the province of Agrigento, Region of Sicily, southern Italy, between the Verdura and Magazzolo valleys in the so-called Plain of San Nicola.

The town is connected by the SS115 state road, leading from Trapani to Syracuse. The Platani River, the third Sicilian river, flows nearby. It has enormously contributed to developing both farming and tourism in the area. Its mouth has been designated as a natural reserve.

History
The comune probably rose on the site of the ancient Allava, to which the Byzantine necropolis near the modern town may possibly be attributed. In 1627, Luigi Guglielmo Moncada, Prince of Paternò, founded a new centre named after his wife, Maria Alfan di Ribera; the new centre developed rapidly, thanks to the fertility of the soil and the accessibility of the area.

It is the birthplace of Prime Minister Francesco Crispi.

Main sights
Sights include:
The Chiesa Madre, founded in the 18th century, facing the Piazza Duomo ("Cathedral Square"). 
The Town Hall (19th century) is in the same square. 
In Via Crispi is the house where Francesco Crispi, leader of the Italian government between 1887 and 1896, was born. 
The Garibaldi Garden offers a botanical itinerary.

Just outside the town, on a gorge overlooking the Verdura river is the Castello di Poggio Diana, built by Guglielmo Peralta in the 14th century. A Bronze Age necropolis (13th century BC) was discovered near the town.

Also outside the town is the Borgo Bonsignore, a village founded under Fascism  as part of the "colonization" policy that encouraged the creation of new villages; it has now grown as a summer resort.

Economy
Agriculture is the commune's main industry, notably involved in the cultivation and marketing of the Washington navel orange – here introduced by emigrants returned from the United States – and strawberries. Such businesses are enhanced both by excellent climatic and environmental conditions and a supporting policy by the local authorities.

Twin towns
 Oinousses, Greece
  Elizabeth, USA

See also
Caltabellotta

External links
 Official website
Ribera  - Photos, history, traditions, news
Arancia di Ribera D.O.P.